Kilmacanogue is a village in north County Wicklow, Ireland.

Location and transport
It lies between the Little Sugar Loaf to the east and the Great Sugar Loaf to the west in the northeastern foothills of the Wicklow Mountains, near the Glen of the Downs.

Two small streams join in Kilmacanogue, behind the old Post Office (Donnelly's), to form the Kilmacanogue River, which flows into the River Dargle near the old "Silver Bridge" at Kilbride, approximately two miles to the north, just downstream of the confluence with the Cookstown River. These watercourses once held a good population of trout but increasing urbanisation led to a deterioration in water quality.

Kilmacanogue is served by the half-hourly 45A/B bus to Dún Laoghaire and Bray, a route operated by Go-Ahead Ireland. Until 2014 it was served by high-frequency Dublin Bus route 145 to Heuston Station; however, this was cut short to terminate in Ballywaltrim and the 45A route was extended to serve Kilmacanogue. Only a handful of route 145 journeys still continue to Kilmacanogue. It is also served by Bus Éireann route 133.

History
The village is named after Saint Mocheanog, a companion of Saint Patrick's who, according to legend, baptised the Children of Lir just before their death.

On the morning of 1 January 1942, the German Luftwaffe dropped two magnetic mines near Kilmacanogue but they did not explode.

Amenities
The village has two petrol stations, a primary school, a restaurant, a small shop, a post office, a church, and a pub. The pub, variously called "Connolly's", "Sweeney's", The Glencormac Inn and most lately "Plucks" is an old coaching house dating back to the 19th century. The Plucks were a family who lived in the area in the 1800s and early 1900s. It was a place where teams of horses were changed and stabled on the old road to Wicklow and further south. Charles Stewart Parnell was a frequent passenger on his way to his family house in Avondale – hence his moniker "The Blackbird of Avondale" – a ballad sung in his memory. It was not until 1861 that the railway was opened as far as Rathdrum, hence the need to travel by coach up to that time.

Business
Avoca Handweavers have one of their earliest outlets at the northern end of the village. This is situated on the site of Glencormac House which was completed in 1860 by the Jameson Whiskey family, who were originally from Scotland. The house became a hotel (Grade A, a precursor to five-star rated hotels) in the 1950s but was razed to the ground in a fire that occurred in 1967.

Clubs and organisations
Kilmacanogue is home to the Kilmacanogue GAA Club, a branch of the Cubs and the Scouts, Kilmac Drama, karate, Kilmacanogue History Society, and Glencormac United football club.

Notable people
 Mary Coughlan, singer, was living in Kilmacanogue as at January 2021
 Mariella Frostrup, journalist and broadcaster

See also
 List of towns and villages in Ireland

References

Towns and villages in County Wicklow